Liromoba is one of the 60 assembly constituencies of  Arunachal Pradesh a north east state of India. It is part of Arunachal East Lok Sabha constituency.

Members of Legislative Assembly
 1990: Lijum Ronya, Indian National Congress
 1995: Lijum Ronya, Indian National Congress
 1999: Lijum Ronya, Indian National Congress
 2004: Jarbom Gamlin, Indian National Congress
 2009: Jarbom Gamlin, Indian National Congress
 2014: Jarbom Gamlin, Indian National Congress
 2015: Nyamar Karbak, Indian National Congress

Election results

2019

See also

 Liromoba
 West Siang district
 List of constituencies of Arunachal Pradesh Legislative Assembly

References

Assembly constituencies of Arunachal Pradesh
West Siang district